IGRS may refer to:

 Irish Genealogical Research Society
 Indonesian Game Rating System